The Cook Family Singers were originally formed in 1885 by David J Cook and his wife Martha, who hailed from Fort Lauderdale, Florida.  They had six children, and on Sunday afternoons after church they would pass time by perfecting their singing of harmonies and old gospel blend, developing a unique blend and harmony style that would become their signature sound, much like that of the Carter Family and Happy Goodmans.

Biography
After several years of singing on a local level, the family was asked to perform at fairs and church functions throughout the country. The public response was overwhelming to the group as their popularity grew. Martha was every bit the perfectionist as she taught the children stage presence and how to deal with the public at large. She added the comic relief to the group.  Not all six children sang in the original group, only three.

After 18 years of performing, the Cooks became one of the country's premier gospel groups. David and Martha were at a point of retirement, so they handed the group over to their oldest son Lamaar Cook. Lamaar and the other two siblings continued as a trio until 1932 when two of Lamaar's children joined the group.

Grand Ole Opry
Maybelle Carter of the Carter Family heard the Cooks at the 1933 World's Fair in Chicago, Illinois. She asked the Cooks to go on the road with them, to which they gladly agreed. During their time with the Carter Family, they were heard by Roy Acuff, and Roy asked them to make their first appearance on the Grand Ole Opry show. The Cooks became one of the first regular gospel groups to perform on the Grand Ole Opry.

Modern Cook Family
The final generation of Cook Family Singers consisted of June"Mama" Cook (died 1997) and several other family members.  This generation was the most controversial of all. Donnell, who was not a full-time member of the group had a drinking problem that caused him at times to be very violent with his family. June was a model, but her career was cut short after Donnell hit her in the face with the butt of a gun during one of his drunken states. The youngest member of the group was their son David L Cook. David, also known as "Little David," acted as the comic relief for the group. Donnell would become extremely violent with David, and after years of abuse, David developed several psychological disorders. David suffered from a dissociative disorder in conjunction with psychogenic amnesia. The family retired in 1980 which caused people to speculate that it was due to divorce, however, the Cooks were officially divorced the first time in 1970. David continued in the music industry singing pop and gospel. In 1990, David suffered what doctors believed was a full-blown stroke. After review, it was found that it was part of his disorder.
The whole story was told on The 700 Club in 1999 after David received a Dove Award nomination for Christian Country Album of the Year. June died on April 9, 1997 from complications of COPD. Donnell died on May 13, 2001 from complications of a brain aneurysm. He was involved in an automobile accident in which his car came to rest between two trees. He was hospitalized and finally released. He never regained his sight or ability to recognize people. On May 13, 2001 he was re-admitted to the Singing River Hospital in Pascagoula, Mississippi, where he died later that day.

David L Cook

David was five years old when he joined the group on the circuit. He was a part of the comic relief which would eventually turn into his career as decorated Christian recording artist and comedian. David's story about childhood abuse and family dysfunction has been outlined in many television shows as well as talk shows. David has won seven Emmy Awards and eight Telly Awards for his work in television musicals and theme songs.

Discography
Final Generation Partial Discography

References

External links
David L. Cook Official Website

Family musical groups
Musical groups from Fort Lauderdale, Florida
Country music groups from Florida
Southern gospel performers
American gospel musical groups
Emmy Award winners
Musical groups established in 1885
1885 establishments in Florida